Publicationes Mathematicae Debrecen is a Hungarian mathematical journal, edited and published in Debrecen, at the Mathematical Institute of the University of Debrecen. It was founded by Alfréd Rényi, Tibor Szele, and Ottó Varga in 1950. The current editor-in-chief is Lajos Tamássy.

External links
 The journal's homepage
 On-line papers

Mathematics journals
University of Debrecen